Austroturris is a genus of sea snails, marine gastropod mollusks in the family Borsoniidae.

Species
Species within the genus Austroturris include:
 Austroturris steira (Hedley, 1922)

References

 Laseron, C. 1954. Revision of the New South Wales Turridae (Mollusca). Australian Zoological Handbook. Sydney : Royal Zoological Society of New South Wales 1-56, pls 1–12.

External links
  Bouchet, P.; Kantor, Y. I.; Sysoev, A.; Puillandre, N. (2011). A new operational classification of the Conoidea. Journal of Molluscan Studies. 77, 273-308